Chris Anthony is an artist from Stockholm, Sweden, primarily known for his macabre and Victorian Gothic-inspired photographs. Anthony has also directed commercials for companies such as Deutsche Telekom, USC, Dell and music videos for groups such as The Dandy Warhols.

Anthony is currently based in Los Angeles, California.

References

External links
 Official Homepage
 Photography at Underground Voices

Swedish photographers
Living people
Year of birth missing (living people)
21st-century Swedish photographers